Goddard House may refer to:

in the United States
(by state then city)
John Goddard House, Brookline, Massachusetts, NRHP-listed
Goddard House (Worcester, Massachusetts), NRHP-listed in Worcester County
Harry Goddard House, Worcester, Massachusetts, NRHP-listed in Worcester County
Robert H. Goddard House, Roswell, New Mexico, listed on the NRHP in Chaves County

See also
Goddard Hall (disambiguation)